Perry Township is a township in Davis County, Iowa, USA.  As of the 2000 census, its population was 333.

History
Perry Township was organized in 1846. It is named for Matthew C. Perry.

Geography
Perry Township covers an area of 29.14 square miles (75.48 square kilometers); of this, 0.01 square miles (0.03 square kilometers) or 0.04 percent is water. The stream of Butter Creek runs through this township.

Unincorporated towns
 Shunem
(This list is based on USGS data and may include former settlements.)

Adjacent townships
 Lick Creek Township (north)
 Salt Creek Township (northeast)
 Union Township (east)
 Prairie Township (southeast)
 Cleveland Township (southwest)
 Soap Creek Township (northwest)

Cemeteries
The township contains four cemeteries: Pewter, Shunem, Stark and White.

Major highways
 U.S. Route 63

References
 U.S. Board on Geographic Names (GNIS)
 United States Census Bureau cartographic boundary files

External links
 US-Counties.com
 City-Data.com

Townships in Davis County, Iowa
Townships in Iowa